Innovative Motorsports (IMI) is a former NASCAR team. It was owned by George DeBidart and began racing in the Busch North Series in the mid-1990s, before moving to the Busch Series in 1998.

Winston Cup 
Innovative ran four Cup races during its tenure. Using the No. 98 Chevy purchased from Michael Waltrip Racing, Kenny Wallace ran the Pepsi 400, the Tropicana 400, the Brickyard 400, and the Sirius at the Glen. His best finish was 29th.

Car No. 47 history 
Innovative debuted on the Busch Circuit at the 1998 NAPA Auto Parts 300. Andy Santerre was the driver of the car, the No. 47 Monro Muffler and Brake Chevrolet Monte Carlo, and finished 25th. Santerre was the driver for the whole season, grabbing two top-tens, a pole at Richmond, and NASCAR Busch Series Rookie of the Year honors. The next season, Santerre suffered a broken leg in a crash at Daytona, and missed half of the year. Elliott Sadler filled in for him, posting two top-ten finishes. Santerre returned and won his first career race at Pikes Peak International Raceway. Santerre struggled making the field, and was released. Hermie Sadler finished the year, his best finish a 22nd at Phoenix.

Sadler took over the car full-time in 2000, as it was renumbered the No. 30 and receiving sponsorship from Little Trees. Sadler struggled making races as well, and would soon be released. Chad Little replaced him, but when his performance didn't improve over Sadler's, Sadler came back to finish the year, and posted a seventh-place run at Pikes Peak.

After the team did not run in 2001, it returned in 2002 as the No. 47 with rookie Shane Hmiel driving with sponsorship from Mike's Hard Lemonade. Hmiel had two poles, eight top-tens and a sixteenth-place points finish, finishing behind Scott Riggs and Johnny Sauter for Rookie of the Year. The team closed after that.

Car No. 48 history 
The second Innovative car made its debut in 2000 at Daytona with Mike McLaughlin, sponsored by Goulds Pumps. He wrecked and finished 26th. McLaughlin struggled through the course of the season, and had six top-tens en route to a 24th-place points finish. Just before the 2001 season, McLaughlin quit the team for Joe Gibbs Racing, and was replaced by Kenny Wallace. Wallace had two poles as well as a victory in North Carolina Speedway, finishing 10th in points. After Stacker 2 came on as a sponsor, Wallace improved to seventh in points in 2002 and had thirteen top-tens, but did not win. After the No. 47 team closed its doors, Hmiel moved to the 48 and had ten top-tens and was in eighth in points, when he was suspended by NASCAR for violating its drug policy.  Jeff Green, Todd Bodine, Carlos Contreras, Randy LaJoie, and Kerry Earnhardt finished out the year for the team.

Craftsman Truck Series 
In 2004, Innovative closed its Busch teams, and signed with Toyota to field entries in the Craftsman Truck Series, the No. 12 driven by Robert Huffman and the No. 21 driven by Hank Parker Jr. Huffman, a rookie, had six top-tens, but failed to finish nine races and ended up twenty-third in points. Parker Jr. had four top-tens and finished 17th in points. Due to a lack of funding, Innovative closed up for good at the end of the season, with Huffman's team being sold to Darrell Waltrip Motorsports, and Parker's team to Capital Motorsports.

Truck No. 12 Results

Truck No. 21 Results

References

External links
George Debidart - NASCAR Owner

Auto racing teams established in 1998
Sports clubs disestablished in 2005
Companies based in North Carolina
Defunct NASCAR teams
American auto racing teams
Defunct companies based in North Carolina